The Jayasagara class is a class of Offshore patrol vessels that are part of the Sri Lankan Navy and have been locally built.

History
Built by Colombo Dockyard Limited for the Sri Lankan Navy in the early 1980s, these were the first warships built in Sri Lanka in modern times. Designed for off shore patrol and naval fire support on coastal areas they have seen action with the Sri Lankan Navy for more than 20 years.

Two ships of this class were built.  Currently one is still in service while the other was lost due to a suicide attack carried out by the LTTE. Mostly used for patrol duties, they have been deployed on many occasions to support amphibious operations carried out by the navy along with the Sri Lanka Army.

The knowledge gained in developing this class has been useful in the development of new Coastal Surveillance Vessel class for the Maldivian Coast Guard.

Ships

References 

Ships of the Sri Lanka Navy
Patrol boat classes
Post–Cold War military equipment of Sri Lanka